Henrietta "Netta" Franklin, CBE born Henrietta Montagu (9 April 1866 – 7 January 1964) was a British educationist and suffragist. She championed the Parents' National Educational Union and the ideas of Charlotte Mason.

Life
Franklin was born in London in 1866 to Henrietta and Samuel Montagu, 1st Baron Swaythling. She was the eldest of eleven children. The family business was banking and philanthropy.

Via her husband Ernest Louis Franklin, she was related by marriage to Rosalind Franklin, co-discoverer of the structure of DNA.

In 1890 she met Charlotte Mason in what others consider to be the "inspiring experience" of Franklin's life. By 1892 she had opened the first school in London based on Mason's principles. In 1894 Franklin became the secretary of the renamed Parents' National Educational Union and Franklin undertook speaking tours to major cities in America, Europe and South Africa. She devoted her own money to the cause and wrote on its behalf. Franklin's biography cites the PNEU's continued existence to her.

Her sister Lily Montagu led a liberal Jewish movement in Britain and in February 1902 they arranged the first meeting of the Jewish Religious Union for the Advancement of Liberal Judaism at Franklin's house.

Franklin was one of the few Jewish women to raise their profile in the suffrage movement. In 1912 she helped her in-laws Laura and Leonard Franklin form the Jewish League for Woman Suffrage which was open to both male and female members. The organisation sought both political and religious rights for women. It was felt that some Jewish people may be more inclined to join this group in preference to an unspecific women's suffrage group. Other members included Edith Ayrton, Hugh Franklin, her sister Lily Montagu and Inez Bensusan. The organisation was generally moderate but it had radical members. Some were responsible for disrupting synagogue services to make their point in 1913 and 1914. They were labelled as "blackguards in bonnets" by the Jewish community. However Henrietta achieved wider acceptance and became President of the National Union of Women's Suffrage Societies in 1916.

In 1950 she was appointed a CBE. Franklin died in 1964 in London.

Posthumous recognition
Her name and picture (and those of 58 other women's suffrage supporters) are on the plinth of the statue of Millicent Fawcett in Parliament Square, London, unveiled in 2018.

References 

1866 births
1964 deaths
People from London
Education activists
English Jews
English suffragists
Jewish feminists
Jewish suffragists
Commanders of the Order of the British Empire
Daughters of barons
Presidents of the National Council of Women of Great Britain